The 1924 Daniel Baker Hillbillies football team represented Daniel Baker College as a member of the Texas Intercollegiate Athletic Association (TIAA) during the 1924 college football season. Led by Grady Higginbotham in his first season and only season as head coach, the team went 3–6–1.

Schedule

References

Daniel Baker
Daniel Baker Hillbillies football seasons
Daniel Baker Hillbillies football